John E. Smith was a Swiss immigrant to the United States who served as a Union general during the American Civil War.

John E. Smith may also refer to:

 John E. Smith (New York politician) (1843–1907), American politician
 John E. Smith, Director of U.S. Treasury Office of Foreign Assets Control
 John Eldon Smith (1930–1983), American murderer
 John Edwin Smith, American philosopher
 J. E. Smith (c. 1862/1863–1912), English trade union leader

See also
 John Smith (disambiguation)
 Johnny Smith (disambiguation)